Volkstheater  is a station on  and  of the Vienna U-Bahn. It is located in the Innere Stadt District. It opened in 1980.

Art

"Das Werden der Natur" by Anton Lehmden is found in this station.

References

External links 
 

Buildings and structures in Innere Stadt
Railway stations opened in 1980
Vienna U-Bahn stations